A list of Western films released in the 1960s.

TV series of the 1960s
List of Westerns on television

References

Western
1960